Shane Cleaver (born ) is a New Zealand rugby union footballer. His regular playing position is prop. He represents the Chiefs in Super Rugby and Taranaki in the ITM Cup.

Early life 
Shane captained the Hurricanes Under 18 Schools Team that played in the NZ Schools Regional Tournament. He was then selected in the New Zealand Schools Team to play two games in Australia. He went on to score a try in the first game and played against Australian Schools in the test match won by New Zealand 22–19. Shane was the first student from FDMC to be selected in the New Zealand Schools Team.

References

External links 
espnscrum.com profile
itsrugby.co.uk profile
yahoo.com profile

Living people
1987 births
New Zealand rugby union players
Chiefs (rugby union) players
Rugby union props
Taranaki rugby union players
People educated at Francis Douglas Memorial College